Dalavaipalayam is a village in the Papanasam taluk of Thanjavur district, Tamil Nadu, India.

Demographics 

As per the 2001 census, Dalavaipalayam had a total population of 981 with 477 males and 504 females. The sex ratio was 1057. The literacy rate was 66.39.

References 

 

Villages in Thanjavur district